USRC Moccasin  was a Revenue Cutter purchased from the U.S. Navy in 1865 and immediately assigned to duty at Norfolk, Virginia where future Chief of the Revenue Marine Service, Leonard G. Shepard, future Chief of the Revenue Marine Bureau reported on board as a newly commissioned Third Lieutenant as part of the commissioning crew. In May 1866 her homeport was moved to Wilmington, North Carolina where she served until being moved for repairs at the Philadelphia Navy Yard in 1869. After repairs she was assigned to Newport, Rhode Island from 1869 to 1872 and then transferred to Charleston, South Carolina. In 1881, she was taken to the Slater and Read Shipyard in New York City and was lengthened to 128 feet. On 10 April 1882 she was recommissioned as USRC George Bibb and moved to the Great Lakes. The George Bibb was named after the seventeenth Secretary of the Treasury, George M. Bibb. While winter quarters were at Ogdensburg, New York, she was also stationed at Duluth, Minnesota, Detroit, Michigan and Oswego, New York. After decommissioning in November 1890, she was sold in Buffalo, New York for $2500. She became the merchant vessel Pentagoet which foundered in November 1898.

References

King, Irving H (1996). The Coast Guard Expands:1865–1915, Naval Institute Press. , p. 72
Canney, Donald (1995). U.S. Coast Guard and Revenue Cutters, 1790-1935, Naval Institute Press, p. 36

Ships of the United States Revenue Cutter Service
1864 ships